Major-General Sir Walter Fullarton Lodovic Lindsay  (15 May 1855 – 7 March 1930) was a British Army officer who was a senior figure in the Royal Artillery during the First World War.

Military career
Lindsay was born into a Scottish family in Kensington, London, the son of Captain Alexander Lindsay of the 8th Hussars, and his wife, Jane. He was educated in Scotland before continuing to the Royal Military Academy, Woolwich.

He followed his father into the Army, joining the Royal Artillery and seeing overseas service in the Egyptian Campaign of 1882 and the Second Boer War from 1899 to 1900. He was mentioned in despatches and awarded the Distinguished Service Order for his service in South Africa. He later rose to command the Southern Division of the artillery in 1906, and in 1912 was appointed to command the West Lancashire Division of the Territorial Force. On the outbreak of the First World War, he was appointed as the chief artillery officer of the British Expeditionary Force, with the rank of Major-General.

He served on the Western Front for the first months of the war; however, there were few centralised artillery forces commanded by corps or GHQ at this stage, and as a result Lindsay was sidelined and rarely involved in field operations. He was replaced by John du Cane in January 1915, returning home with a knighthood and appointed as the Inspector of Royal Horse Artillery and Royal Field Artillery. He was later briefly commander of 50th (Northumbrian) Division before retiring in 1917.

He died in London after a long illness.

References

|-

1855 births
1930 deaths
British Army major generals
People from Kensington
Graduates of the Royal Military Academy, Woolwich
Royal Artillery officers
Knights Commander of the Order of the Bath
British Army generals of World War I
Companions of the Distinguished Service Order
Military personnel from London
British Army personnel of the Anglo-Egyptian War
British Army personnel of the Second Boer War